Sir Montague Cholmeley, 1st Baronet (20 March 1772 – 10 March 1831) was a British politician and baronet.

Early life and family 
Montague Cholmeley was born on 20 March 1772, the eldest son of Montague Cholmeley, of Easton, and Sarah Sibthorp, daughter of  Humphry Sibthorp of Canwick, Professor of botany of  Oxford University and his first wife Sarah Waldo. Cholmeley was educated at Magdalen College, Oxford, and graduated with a Bachelor of Arts (BA) in 1794. He proceeded to Master of Arts (MA) in 1808. In 1810, he was awarded a Doctor of Civil Law (DCL).

He married twice; firstly, Elizabeth Harrison, daughter of John Harrison, on 14 September 1801. They had three daughters and three sons. Elizabeth died in 1822, and Cholmeley married secondly Catherine Way, fourth daughter of Benjamin Way on 26 March 1826. He was succeeded in the baronetcy by his oldest son Montague.

Career 

Cholmeley was High Sheriff of Lincolnshire in 1805 and sat as Member of Parliament (MP) for Grantham from 1820 until 1826, when he retired in favour of his son. In 1821, Cholmeley was Vice-President of the London Society for Promoting Christianity Amongst the Jews (a Jewish Christian missionary society now known as the Church's Ministry Among Jewish People or CMJ). He was created a baronet, of Easton, in the County of Lincoln on 4 March 1806.

He is buried in Stoke Rochford in Lincolnshire with a monument by Robert Blore.

References

Citations

Bibliography
 P. Salmon and M. Casey (2009). "Cholmeley, Sir Montague, 1st bt. (1772-1831), of Easton Hall and Norton Place, Lincs." in The History of Parliament: the House of Commons 1820-1832, ed. D.R. Fisher

External links

1772 births
1831 deaths
Alumni of Magdalen College, Oxford
Baronets in the Baronetage of the United Kingdom
Members of the Parliament of the United Kingdom for English constituencies
UK MPs 1820–1826
High Sheriffs of Lincolnshire
Montague
Cholmeley baronets